Pociūnai is a village in the east of Radviliškis district municipality in Šiauliai County, Lithuania. It is located on the A9 Panevėžys–Šiauliai road, 6 km west of Smilgiai, near the Liūlis stream. Pakalniškių school department, library and post office are in operation.

Villages in Šiauliai County